Scymnus nebulosus, the nebulous lady beetle, is a species of dusky lady beetle in the family Coccinellidae. It is found in North America and Oceania.

References

Further reading

 

Coccinellidae
Articles created by Qbugbot
Beetles described in 1758
Taxa named by Carl Linnaeus